Sogueur District is a district of Tiaret Province, Algeria.

Districts of Tiaret Province